Autokrator or Autocrator ( from  + ; pl. ) is a Greek epithet applied to an individual who is unrestrained by superiors. It has been applied to military commanders-in-chief as well as Roman and Byzantine emperors as the translation of the Latin title imperator. Its connection with Byzantine-style absolutism gave rise to the modern terms autocrat and autocracy.

Ancient Greece 
The title appeared in Classical Greece in the late 5th century BC, and was used for generals given independent authority, i.e. a supreme commander. In Classical Athens,  were generals endowed with autonomous power of command, i.e. they were able to make certain military and diplomatic decisions without prior consultation with the Athenian assembly. This was enacted when the general was expected to operate far from Athens, for instance during the Sicilian Expedition. Nevertheless, the generals remained accountable to the assembly for their conduct upon their return. Similar practices were followed by other Greek states, such as Syracuse, where the post served as a power base for several of the city's tyrants.  were also appointed by various leagues of city-states to head their combined armies. The term was also employed for envoys entrusted with plenipotentiary powers (πρέσβεις αὐτοκράτορες, présbeis autokrátores, "elder autocrats").

In the Iranian languages, the term *hwatā́wā 'lord, sovereign; (literally) self-ruler' might be an intentional calque from Greek  (presumably arisen in the Hellenistic period).

Rome and Byzantium 
In later times, with the rise of the Roman Republic,  was used by Greek historians to translate different Roman terms: Polybius uses the term to translate the title dictator, while Plutarch uses it in its later sense as a translation of the victory title imperator. Autokrátōr became entrenched as the official translation of the latter during the Roman Empire, where imperator was part of the titulature of the Roman emperors. As such it continued to be used in Greek translations from Latin until the adoption of the Greek title  by Emperor Heraclius in 629. 

In the Palaiologan period, this use was extended to include the designated heir. The title is evidenced in coins from 912, in imperial chrysobulls from the 11th century, and in numerous illuminated manuscripts. The term  continued to be used in the Byzantine period as well. The title is particularly prevalent in the 6th century (e.g. for Belisarius), and re-appears in the 10th–11th centuries for senior military commanders.

Other nations 
The Byzantine imperial formula was imitated among the Byzantine influenced nations such as Georgia and Balkan states, and later, most notably, the emerging Tsardom of Russia.

 One of the titles of Georgian kings of Bagrationi dynasty was "Autocrat of all the east and the west", title introduced during David IV and lasted until dissolution of the unified Georgian monarchy during the reign of George VIII, and later dissolution officially confirmed at 1490.
 The rulers of the Second Bulgarian Empire used the title "Emperor (Tsar) of the Bulgarians", in the early reigns with the addition of "and the Vlachs", but Ivan Asen II (r. 1218–41), who after the Battle of Klokotnitsa in 1230 expanded his control over most of the Byzantine Empire's former European possessions, also adopted the title of "Tsar and autokrator of all the Bulgarians and the Greeks", a title which had first been claimed by Prince Simeon I (r. 893–927). 
 Similarly, when the Serbian king Stefan Dušan claimed the imperial title in 1345/46, he used the title "basileus and autokrator of Serbia and of Romania" in Greek, and "Tsar of the Serbs and Greeks" in Serbian. The use of "Romania" (i.e. the land of the Romans, the Byzantine Empire) and not the usual Byzantine formula "of the Romans" signified that although he claimed the direct succession to all Byzantine emperors from the time of Constantine the Great, he lacked possession of Constantinople and of the Ecumenical Patriarchate, which alone conferred full legitimacy. 
 Deriving from this usage, the Russian tsars, from the establishment of the Russian Empire up to the fall of the Russian monarchy in 1917, used the formula "Emperor and Autocrat of All the Russias".

References

Further reading

Ancient Greek titles
Byzantine imperial titles